Humberto Posada (born 5 September 1922) is a Colombian former fencer. He competed in the team foil, team épée and individual sabre events at the 1964 Summer Olympics.

References

External links
 

1922 births
Possibly living people
Colombian male épée fencers
Olympic fencers of Colombia
Fencers at the 1964 Summer Olympics
Colombian male foil fencers
Colombian male sabre fencers
20th-century Colombian people